This is a list of airlines currently operating in the Netherlands.

Scheduled airlines

Charter airlines

Cargo airlines

See also
 List of defunct airlines of Netherlands
 List of defunct airlines of Europe
 List of airlines

References

Netherlands
Airlines